Gérard Guillaumaud (1961 – November 29, 2006), was a French Air Force test pilot.

Guillaumaud was born in France and was a graduate of the National Test Pilot School (NTPS) in Mojave, California.

Guillaumaud was piloting a demonstration flight aboard the second Grob G180 SPn test aircraft (Aircraft registration: D-CGSP). When he was approaching the Mindelheim-Mattsies airport  both elevators and the left horizontal stabilizer separated from the aircraft. the G180 hit the ground and Guillaumaud died in the impact.

In 2004 he completed a non-stop crossing of the north Atlantic in a Diamond DA42 Twin Star and according to the Fédération Aéronautique Internationale (FAI) he holds a number of world records in aviation. The European Flight Test Safety Award was established by his fiancée Heidi Biermeier to honour him and his life’s work.

References

External links
 Flight test safety committee awards
 Grob Aerospace

1961 births
2006 deaths
Aviators killed in aviation accidents or incidents in Germany
French aviation record holders
French test pilots